Andrés Díaz may refer to:
 
 Andrés Díaz (cellist) (born 1964), cellist, Associate Professor at Southern Methodist University
 Andrés Manuel Díaz (born 1969), Spanish middle-distance runner
 Andrés Díaz (Argentine footballer) (born 1983), Argentine football midfielder 
 Andrés Díaz (Chilean footballer) (born 1995), Chilean football midfielder

See also
André Dias (born 1979), Brazilian football defender